This list covers television programs whose first letter (excluding "the") of the title is O.

O

Numbers
O2Be

OB
Obi-Wan Kenobi
The Oblongs

OC
The O.C.
Ocean of Fear: Worst Shark Attack Ever
Ocean Girl
The Octonauts

OD
The Odd Couple (1970)
The Odd Couple (2015)
Odd Folks Home
Odd Job Jack
Odd Man Out (UK)
Odd Man Out (US)
Odd Mom Out
Odd One In (British comedy panel game show)
Odd One Out (British TV quiz)
Odd Squad
Oddbods
Oddities
Oddville, MTV
Odyssey 5

OF
The Office (UK)
The Office (US) (1995)
The Office (US) (2005)
Off Limits
Off the Air
Off the Map

OG
O'Grady
Oggy and the Cockroaches

OH
Ohara
Oh Madeline
Oh! Those Bells
Oh Yeah! Cartoons

OK
OK K.O.! Let's Be Heroes
OK! TV (UK)

OL
The Old Man
Óli á Hrauni (Icelandic)
Oliver Beene
Olivia
Ollie and Scoops (Web series)

OM
Omnibus, Italian talk show (2002)
Omnibus, UK series (1967)
Omnibus, US series (1952)
Om Nom Stories
Omukae desu, Japanese television drama

ON
On the Rocks
On the Team
On the Up (British Sitcom)
Once Again (Philippines)
Once and Again
Once Upon a Time
Once Upon a Time in Wonderland
One Day at a Time (1975)
One Day at a Time (2017)
One Foot in the Grave
One Life to Live
One Man's Family
One on One
One Piece, Japanese anime series
One-Punch Man, Japanese anime series (2015)
The One Show (British)
One Stroke Painting with Donna Dewberry
One Tree Hill
Online Nation
Only Fools and Horses
Only Murders in the Building
The Only Way Is Essex (British)

OO
Oobi

OP
Opening Act
Open All Hours 
Open Heart
Open House (Ireland)
Operation Love (China)
Opposite Sex
Opposite Worlds
Oprah's Lifeclass
Oprah's Master Class
Oprah Prime
Oprah: Where Are They Now?
The Oprah Winfrey Show

OR
The Oregon Trail
Orphan Black
The O'Reilly Factor
Orange Is the New Black
The Original Amateur Hour
The Originals

OS
The Osbournes
 Oscar's Oasis
Oswald

OT
The Others
The Other Kingdom
The Other Two
Otherworld

OU
Our America with Lisa Ling
Our Flag Means Death
Our Friends in the North
Our Hero
Our House
Our Miss Brooks
Our Private World
Outback Jack
OutDaughtered
Outlaw
Out of the Blue
Out of the Box
Out of Control
Out of Jimmy's Head
Out of This World
Out There (2003)
Outer Banks
The Outer Limits (1963)
The Outer Limits (1995)
Outer Space Astronauts
Outlaws (1960–1962)
Outlaws (1986–1987)
Outnumbered (British sitcom)
Outside the Lines
The Outsiders (Australia)
The Outsiders (Taiwan)
The Outsiders (US)
Outsiders (Australia)
Outsiders (US)
Outsourced

OV
Over the Garden Wall
Over There

OW
Owen Marshall: Counselor at Law
The Owl House

OZ
Oz
Ozark
Ozark Jubilee
The Oz Kids
Ozzy & Drix
Ozzy & Jack's World Detour
Previous:  List of television programs: N    Next:  List of television programs: P